Hila Lulu Lin (Hebrew: הילה לולו לין)  (born November 6, 1964) is an Israeli multi-disciplinary artist, engaged in painting, cinema, poetry, sculpture, visual arts, photography, performance and video art.

Biography 

Hila Lin (later Lulu Lin) was born on Kibbutz Mishmar HaEmek. When she was two years old, her parents were sent to Qazvin, Iran for three years as aliyah emissaries. When the family returned to Israel they moved to Kfar Bilu. Lulu Lin studied at Bezalel Academy of Arts and Design in Jerusalem in 1986–1989.

She lives and works in Tel Aviv. Her partner is the artist Hanna Farah-Kufer Bir'im.

Art career
Lin works in various artistic areas in local culture and her works has had a remarkable effect in Israeli art. Until Lin, in Israeli art, it was rare to deal with internal organs of body or connect them to architecture or transformation processes as they performed. She continually deals with body, sexuality, alienation, and detachedness, and the body of her works are sculpture, poetry, drawings, photographs, video works, and her later works - express a personal aesthetic that breaks normative boundaries.

Her artistic-surrealistic language is expressed in crossbreeding and manipulations that she creates in her body in front of a camera, processes computer simulations or expresses words in her poems, with rhetoric that combines erotica, fear, distress and rejection.

Her work echoes the trend of surrealism and Dada of the first half of the 20th century, but at the same time her artistic language speaks out beyond the trends of the era.

Lynn emerged in the scene in the late 1980s, with self-documentation video art including brusque images. She used her body as a way of presenting a body that is an infinite creative space that allows us to point to 'polar' tension between strangers and sellers, clean and impure, life and death, external and internal, large and small.

Her first solo, "The Voice of the Right" (1992), Lin presented sculptural objects made of various items, it was not conventional leave, but rather interrupting breaks between organic and synthetic, concrete and fictional, pleasurable and delightful. Her aesthetics get deeper into more physical direction later on, which already used as objects.

In "No More Tears" (1994), video work which was shown in the exhibition "Metasex 94: Identity, Body and Sexuality" (1994) sensuously expressed the experience of female embodiment in an erotic way. Lin manipulated an egg yolk on her body: the artist slowly rolls an egg yolk along her arm and into her mouth; then, gently easing it out of her mouth and repeated on other side. "Cold Blood" (A Poem in Three Parts), in 1996 created a moment before of Prime Minister Yitzhak Rabin's assassination. The hedonistic character of Tel Aviv's seashore was juxtaposed with the sacredness of the Dome of the Rock, the most sacred Muslim site in Jerusalem. Both iconic landscapes were depicted under raw, bloody skies.

At that time, Lin refused to give any interpretation to her work, and insisted on her right of movement and definition of identity without belonging to any art group.  Nevertheless, she was characterized as: "A provocative challenge to the limited notion of women as mothers and nurturers, this sensuous back-and-forth demonstrated an embodied continuity between inside and outside, linking the passions and pleasures of food with those of sex."

Around the year 2000, Lin expanded the range and size of her works which also became more political, with materials from the public sphere entering and affecting her style.

In her art and poetry, Lin uses her own designed font for her work.

Awards and recognition
 1988-1994 America-Israel Cultural Foundation
 1992 Prize for a Young Artist, Yad Lebanim Museum, Petah Tikvah and Ministry of Education
 1995 Kadishman Young Artist Award on behalf of the American-Israel Cultural Foundation
 1998 Minister of Education and Culture Prize for Visual Arts
 Arthur Goldreich Prize winner
 2002 Isracard Award, Tel Aviv Museum of Art for an Israeli artist

Selected exhibitions

Solo exhibitions 

 2012 – Wonderful World, N&N Aman Gallery, Tel Aviv-Yafo
 2008 – She, Nelyi Aman Gallery, Tel Aviv-Yafo
 2005 – Mole, Tel Aviv Museum of Art
 2002 – Crying in Eight Minutes, Noga Gallery of Contemporary Art, Tel Aviv
 2002 – I Need Some Money Honey, Ray Gun Gallery, Valencia, Spain
 2000 – Absolute Naked, Noga Gallery of Contemporary Art, Tel Aviv
 1999 – Sunny Side Up, Hallwalls Contemporary Arts Center, Buffalo, NY
 1998 – Miles I Would Go, Haifa Museum of Art, Haifa
 1998 – I Am the Queen in the Slave's Palace, The Artists' Studios Gallery, Tel Aviv
 1997 – Pure & Wild, Ambrosino Gallery, Miami, Florida
 1995 – The Air has a Sweet Taste, Nicole Klagsbrun Gallery, New York
 1995 – A Cow, a Fish, and a Goldturtle, Ambrosino Gallery, Coral Gables, Florida
 1995 – Everything is Six Times Lighter on the Moon, Artifact Gallery, Tel Aviv
 1993 – Still Lifeless with Cub, Artifact Gallery, Tel Aviv
 1992 – The Voice of Days, Bograshov Gallery, Tel Aviv
 1992 – Never Dirty, The Art Workshop Gallery, Yavneh, Israel

Selected group exhibitions 

 2011 – New on Paper: Recent Acquisitions in the Prints and Drawings Collection, Israel museum, Jerusalem
 2011 – Kaf Be'september, the Spaceship, Tel Aviv-Yafo
 2011 – Lesbit Katlaneet, Hen Cinema, Tel Aviv-Yafo
 2010 – Susan Hiller: a work in Progress, Israel Museum, Jerusalem
 2010 – Stop Makin Sense, Oslo Kunstforening/Oslo Fine Art Society, Oslo, Norway
 2010 – Israeli Art from the collection of Gaby and Ami Brown, Mishkan LeOmanut, Museum of Art, Ein Harod, Israel
 2010 – More Then One, Jerusalem Print Workshop, Jerusalem
 2009 – Rite Now: Sacred and Secular in Video, the Jewish Museum, NYC
 2009 – Landsc®ape: Representation Matrixes, Petach Tikva Museum of Art, Petach Tikva
 2006 – The Raft of the Medusa: Israeli Art and the Monster of Identity, Krolikarnia, The National Museum, Warsaw
 2006 – Portfolios: From the Gottesman Etching Center, Kibbutz Cabri, The Israel Museum, Jerusalem; Tel Aviv Museum of Art
 2006 – Far and Away: The Fantasy of Japan in Contemporary Israeli Art, The Israel Museum, Jerusalem
 2004 – Seven Sins, Museo d'arte moderna e contemporanea, Bolzano, Italy
 2004 – Love is in the Air, Time for Art – Israeli Art Center, Tel Aviv
 2004 – Shame, The Israeli Center for Digital Art, Holon, Israel
 2003 – Banquete, Centre of Contemporary Art, Palau de la Virreina, Barcelona; Zentrum für Kunst und Medientechnologie (ZKM), Karlsruhe; Conde Duque Cultural Centre, Madrid
 2000 – Exposure: Recent Acquisitions, the Doron Sebbag Art Collection, O.R.S. Ltd., Tel Aviv Museum of Art
 2000 –  A Wall of My Own: Israeli Art, A Selection from the Benno Kalev Collection, Tel Aviv Museum of Art
 2000 – The Vera, Silvia and Arturo Schwarz Collection of Contemporary Art, Tel Aviv Museum of Art
 2000 – Local Time 1: New Video Works by Israeli Artists, Tel Aviv Cinematheque
 1998 – To the East: Orientalism in the Arts in Israel, The Israel Museum, Jerusalem
 1998 – Double Rivage, Centre Regional d'Art Contemporain, Sete, France
 1997 – Delicious Art Exhibition, Tempozan Contemporary Art Museum, Osaka, Japan
 1996 – Desert Cliché: Israel Now – Local Images, Mishkan Le'Omanut, Museum of Art, Ein Harod, Israel; Herzliya Museum of Art, Israel; Bass Museum of Art, Miami Beach, Florida; Grey Art Gallery, New York University; Nexus Contemporary Art Center, Atlanta; Yerba Buena Center for the Arts, San Francisco
 1994 – Meta-Sex 94: Identity, Body and Sexuality, Mishkan Le'Omanut, Museum of Art, Ein Harod, Israel
 1993 –  Antipathos: Black Humor, Irony and Cynicism in Contemporary Israeli Art, The Israel Museum, Jerusalem

References

External links 
 
Hila Lulu Lin at the Israel Museum. Retrieved February 2012
 
 Hila Lulu Lin at the Museum of Art, Ein Harod 

1964 births
Living people
20th-century Israeli women artists
21st-century Israeli women artists
Israeli women painters
Israeli women sculptors
Israeli women photographers
Israeli erotic artists